Fred Wright may refer to:
 Fred Wright (cartoonist) (1907–1984), American labor cartoonist and activist
 Fred Wright (historian) (born 1947), British historian and theologian
 Frederick Wright (politician) (born 1933), Progressive Conservative party member of the House of Commons of Canada
 Frederick Eugene Wright (1877–1953), American optician and geophysicist
 Frederick Wright (cricketer) (1855–1929), English cricketer
 Fred Wright (researcher), American engineer
 Fred Wright (cyclist) (born 1999), British racing cyclist
 Fred Wright (actor),(aka Fred Wright Jr.) actor, born Kent England (1865-1928). In some source books confused with American director Fred E. Wright. His father was also an actor, Fred Wright, Sr.(1826-1911)
Fred E. Wright (director), American actor and director (1868-1936)